Nicollet Township is a township in Nicollet County, Minnesota, United States. The population was 511 at the 2000 census.

Nicollet Township was organized in 1858, and was named after the county in which it is located.

Geography
According to the United States Census Bureau, the township has a total area of 33.4 square miles (86.6 km), of which 33.1 square miles (85.8 km) is land, and 0.3 square miles (0.8 km)(0.96%) is water.

Demographics
At the 2000 census, there were 511 people, 186 households and 149 families residing in the township. The population density was 15.4 per square mile (6.0/km). There were 191 housing units at an average density of 5.8/sq mi (2.2/km). The racial makeup of the township was 100.00% White.

There were 186 households, of which 38.7% had children under the age of 18 living with them, 74.2% were married couples living together, 3.2% had a female householder with no husband present, and 19.4% were non-families. 15.1% of all households were made up of individuals, and 5.9% had someone living alone who was 65 years of age or older. The average household size was 2.75 and the average family size was 3.10.

Age distribution was 27.2% under the age of 18, 5.9% from 18 to 24, 26.2% from 25 to 44, 28.8% from 45 to 64, and 11.9% who were 65 years of age or older. The median age was 40 years. For every 100 females, there were 111.2 males. For every 100 females age 18 and over, there were 109.0 males.

The median household income was $50,000, and the median family income was $52,656. Males had a median income of $34,732 versus $26,094 for females. The per capita income for the township was $21,451.  About 2.5% of families and 2.7% of the population were below the poverty line, including 3.2% of those under age 18 and 1.6% of those age 65 or over.

References

Townships in Nicollet County, Minnesota
Mankato – North Mankato metropolitan area
Townships in Minnesota